Arvind Bhat (born 7 June 1979) is a male badminton player from Bangalore, India.

Career
Arvind started his career in Youth centre at the age of 11 in 1991. He proved his mettle at a young age by winning many age group level events at the state. Trained at Sadashivanagar club from 1994 to 1997. He trained at Karnataka Badminton association from 1997 to 2015.

He went on to win Sr. State Championships in 2001. His performance at State and National level in the year 2001-2002 got the nod of selectors and was selected in the Indian team in the year 2002.
He also got a call from German clubs to play at the leagues matches there and made a base in Europe for the next 12 years living there for 3–5 months in a year every year.
Arvind represented India for 13 years playing in all major events in the world being on tour for almost 8–9 months in a year.

Arvind Bhat won the national championships in India in the year 2008. This was his first National Championships title. This he attained after reaching the finals 4 times in the previous 7 years. Then again he won the title in 2011 defeating Kashyap P in what would be called one of the best Championship finals.

On the international level he has won 7 International title including the Scottish Open 2004, the Czech International 2007 and the 2014 German Open. With the 1. BC Bischmisheim he reached gold in the German team championships 2008. He has represented India in more than 100 International events. More recently he participated in Asian games 2010 in Guanzhou, China and was in the Indian team for Sudirman Cup 2011.

Winning the German Open 2014 is the high light of his career. He made his best result at the age of 35. This is probably a very rare event in the field of Badminton. His highest World ranking has been 20 which was attained in Sep 2009.

Personal life

Married to Pallavi Sengupta, a former Bengal player who has played up to the National level for her state West Bengal.
Pallavi is a Head HR of Paper Boat. They have a son named Paarth and daughter Anika.

Arvind's parents are BP Saraswathi and B Prabhakar. His brother Avinash Bhat was a former National level player and sister Dr. Anupama Bhat also was involved in sports. She was a president guide.
Both his siblings are settled in the US.

Retirement life

Since retirement Arvind has been chief coach at Level Up Badminton Academy in Bangalore. He is also the head coach for Bengaluru Raptors, Premier Badminton League team. He is Currently the co-founder and chief coach of Level Up Badminton Academy, Bangalore which he co-founded along with his childhood friend Prashanth. He is currently a co-owner for the Bengaluru Raptors team at the premier badminton league. He is national selector for junior India team and also one of the coaches for the Indian senior team.

Education

Schooling at St. Joseph's Indian high school until 10th Standard.
PUC at MES College of science.
Engineering at UVCE, Bangalore in Mechanical branch.

Achievements

BWF Grand Prix 
The BWF Grand Prix has two levels, the BWF Grand Prix and Grand Prix Gold. It is a series of badminton tournaments sanctioned by the Badminton World Federation (BWF) since 2007. The World Badminton Grand Prix sanctioned by International Badminton Federation (IBF) since 1983.

Men's singles

 BWF Grand Prix Gold tournament
 BWF & IBF Grand Prix tournament

IBF/BWF International 
Men's singles

References

 https://web.archive.org/web/20110717080215/http://bwfcontent.tournamentsoftware.com/profile/default.aspx?id=F97BD4D2-F120-44D0-9847-4FF52D17FCA6

External links 
 
 
 

1979 births
Living people
Indian male badminton players
Indian national badminton champions
Badminton players at the 2010 Asian Games
Racket sportspeople from Bangalore
University Visvesvaraya College of Engineering alumni
Asian Games competitors for India